Mixed spice, also called pudding spice, is a British blend of sweet spices, similar to the pumpkin pie spice used in the United States. Cinnamon is the dominant flavour, with nutmeg and allspice. It is often used in baking, or to complement fruits or other sweet foods.

The term "mixed spice" has been used for this blend of spices in cookbooks at least as far back as 1828 and probably much earlier.

Mixed spice is very similar to a Dutch spice mix called  or speculaaskruiden, which are used for example to spice food associated with the Dutch Sinterklaas celebration at December 5. It is generally used for sweet pastries eaten during the cold season, such as speculaas (a kind of shortbread) and appeltaart (apple pastry). Koekkruiden can contain cardamom, in addition to cinnamon, cloves and allspice, and sometimes also nutmeg. The tradition of pastries and dishes containing mixed spices together with the frequent use of chocolate during traditional festivities has its roots in the Dutch colonial past.

Ingredients
Mixed spice typically contains:

Cinnamon (or cassia)
Nutmeg
Allspice

It may also contain, or commonly have added to it:

Cloves
Ginger
Coriander (seed)
Caraway
Cayenne pepper (historically)

See also 
Spice mix
Pumpkin pie spice

References 

Herb and spice mixtures
Sinterklaas food